USS LST-36 was an  of the United States Navy built during World War II. She was transferred to the Royal Hellenic Navy on 23 August 1943, before being commissioned into the USN, and was renamed Lemnos (Λήμνος).

Construction 
LST-36 was laid down on 21 April 1943, at Pittsburgh, Pennsylvania by the Dravo Corporation; launched on 10 July 1943; sponsored by Mrs. Franklin Keen; and transferred to the Hellenic Navy on 23 August 1943, and renamed Lemnos (L158).

Service history 
Lemnos sailed from Galveston Bar for Key West, Florida, on 28 August 1943, with convoy HK 125, arriving in Key West, 1 September 1943.

On 11 October 1943, Lemnos left Halifax, Nova Scotia, in convoy SC 144, en route she joined convoy WN 497 that had departed Loch Ewe, on 26 October. She arrived in Methil, Scotland, on 28 October with a load of lumber.

Lemnos departed Methil, on 3 December 1943, in convoy EN 314 (series 2), arriving in Loch Ewe, on 5 December. She departed Liverpool, England, in convoy OS 61/KMS 35, on 8 December 1943. The convoy split on 20 December 1943, with Lemnos continuing on in convoy KMS 35G, arriving in Gibraltar, on 21 December.

On 22 May 1944, Lemnos departed Augusta, Sicily, with convoy VN 41, arriving in Naples, Italy, the following day. She later returned to Augusta, in convoy NV 46, departing Naples, on 16 June, and arriving the next day.

Lemnos sailed for Taranto, Italy, on 9 January 1945, in convoy HP 19, arriving in Piraeus, Greece, on 12 January 1945.

Post-war service
She was sold to the government of Greece in January 1947, and struck from the Navy list on 23 June 1947. She was decommissioned from the Greek navy on 10 May 1977.

References

Bibliography

External links
 
 Λήμνος L-158 (1943-1977) , Hellenic Navy website

 

1943 ships
Ships built in Pittsburgh
LST-1-class tank landing ships of the Hellenic Navy
World War II amphibious warfare vessels of Greece
Ships built by Dravo Corporation